Giovanni Enrico Goccione (???? – 6 December 1952) was an Italian footballer who played as midfielder.

Career 
Goccione was an employee at the Società Assicurazioni Incendi in Turin. He played for Juventus for 11 seasons. Goccione played his first game with Juventus in a 1–1 draw against Torinese. Goccione was the team's capitain in the 1904–05 season, where they won Juventus' first league. Goccione's last game with Juventus was in a 1–1 against Torino on 10 December 1911. Goccione made in his career 37 appearences and three goals.

Hounurs 

 Prima Categoria: 1905

Notes

References

General

Specific 

1952 deaths
Juventus F.C. players
Italian footballers
Date of birth unknown
Association football midfielders